Baratol is an explosive made of a mixture of TNT and barium nitrate, with a small quantity (about 1%) of paraffin wax used as a phlegmatizing agent. TNT typically makes up 25% to 33% of the mixture. Because of the high density of barium nitrate, Baratol has a density of at least 2.5 g/cm3.

Baratol, which has a detonation velocity of only about 4,900 metres per second, was used as the slow-detonating explosive in the explosive lenses of some early atomic bomb designs, with Composition B often used as the fast-detonating component.  Atomic bombs detonated at Trinity in 1945, the Soviet Joe 1 in 1949, and in India in 1972 all used Baratol and Composition B.

Baratol was also used in the Mills bomb, a British hand grenade.

References

Explosives
British inventions